Tonto Natural Bridge is a natural arch in Arizona, United States, that is believed to be the largest natural travertine bridge in the world.

History

This natural bridge was first documented by David Gowan, a Scotsman, in 1877 while hiding from Apache tribe members. Gowan was impressed by the location and persuaded his family to emigrate and live there. Gowan also tried to claim the land for himself under squatter's rights. David Gowan died in January 1926. When deputy sheriff Jim Kline on his regular two week's visit, couldn't locate Gowan at his little cabin, he looked around and secured the help of a posse, which found David's body in Deer Creek.  The remains were buried just where they were found beside the creek.

Gowan family members lived near the bridge until 1948. Their lodge building survives to this day and is included in the National Register of Historic Places. In 1948, Glen L. Randall, a native of Pine, Arizona, purchased the Tonto Natural Bridge, the Lodge including 160 acres surrounding the natural wonder with his father Walter Randall and a brother owning a portion of it also. 
After Randall's death in 1967, his wife Eloise Kleinman Randall sold the property and it eventually was made into a State Park.

Park facilities

Walking trails 
Waterfall Trail - approximately  round trip to waterfall cave.
Picnic tables and recreation area
Gift shop 
Portable restrooms

Closure

It was announced in early 2010 that the park was scheduled to close on June 3, 2010 because of budget cuts and to allow for repairs to the historic lodge. Three groups eventually donated funds to allow the park to stay open until the end of September 2011.

Hours
As of 2020, the Tonto Natural Bridge State Park is open. The park hours are 9:00 am - 5:00 pm, the last entry is at 4:00 pm. The Park entrance fee is $7.00 for adults,  $4.00 for kids between the ages of 7 -13, children 6 and under are free.

References

External links

 

State parks of Arizona
Landforms of Gila County, Arizona
Landmarks in Arizona
Natural arches of Arizona
Parks in Gila County, Arizona
Protected areas established in 1969